There are five women's football leagues in Italy. This is a list of Italian women's clubs.

Serie A

Current 
The following clubs are in the Serie A (women's football) for the 2020–21 season:

 A.C. Milan
 Bari
 Empoli
 Fiorentina
 Florentia
 Hellas Verona
 Juventus
 Internazionale
 Napoli
 Roma
 San Marino
 Sassuolo

Serie B 
The following clubs are in the Serie B (women's football) for the 2020–21 season:

 Brescia
 Cesena
 Chievo Verona
 Lazio
 Perugia
 Pomigliano
 Pontedera
 Ravenna
 Riozzese
 Vicenza

See also 

 Women's football in Italy
 List of women's football teams
 List of women's national football teams
 International competitions in women's association football

References 

Women's football clubs in Italy
Lists of women's association football clubs